Colobothea chemsaki is a species of beetle in the family Cerambycidae. It was described by Giesbert in 1979. It is known from Costa Rica and Mexico.

References

chemsaki
Beetles described in 1979
Beetles of South America